Helder Torres (born 29 June 1975) is a Guatemalan former swimmer who competed in the 1992 Summer Olympics.

References

1975 births
Living people
Guatemalan male freestyle swimmers
Olympic swimmers of Guatemala
Swimmers at the 1992 Summer Olympics
Place of birth missing (living people)